During the time that radio programs were the dominant medium in the United States, some programs advertised "souvenirs" of the various shows, which were sometimes called radio premiums.  The first of these were generally cast photographs and the like, but eventually, these evolved into novelties that many children collected.  

By the 1930s, premiums ranged from rings through pocket novelties to "decoder pins," also called "decoder badges".  Most of these were obtained by sending the sponsor's agency a proof of purchase, such as a boxtop or jar's inner seal, and frequently a small amount of cash, such as a dime.  One amusing address was for Chief Lone Wolf who was strangely on the 14th floor of the Wrigley Building in Chicago.

Many of the rings were multifunctional, having a feature beyond just being jewelry. All were "one size fits all".  Quite a few had "secret compartments," and others had built-in siren whistles.  Some rings were composed in whole or in part of luminous materials.  A premium from Jack Armstrong, the All-American Boy program, offered in 1940, was a ring called the Dragon's Eye Ring, with images of crocodiles supporting a greenish "stone" made of Tenite.  The molds for the ring were later used for two other premiums, one for Buck Rogers in the Twenty-Fifth Century, issued in 1947.  The new ring was called the Buck Rogers Ring of Saturn, and had a red "stone" rather than the green one in the original.  About the same time, a third ring, but with a black stone, was issued by Carey Salt for their sponsorship of The Shadow (another sponsor, Blue Coal, offered an entirely different luminous-plastic ring).  Some rings had a hidden mirror for a "look behind" feature.  Programs that offered such Look-Around rings included Tom Mix Ralston Straight Shooters, Captain Midnight, and The Lone Ranger.  Other rings had spinners, photo viewers, ballpoint pens, magnifiers, signal blinkers, flashlights, etc.

Besides rings, there were many pocket items.  These included sundial "watches," compass-and-magnifiers, pedometers, truth detectors, and signaling devices.  Some premiums required many boxtops.  These included cowboy outfits, a set of cooking equipment for camping and special badges such as "Chief Inspector", "General", etc.

During World War II, restrictions were placed on manufacturing materials, notably copper and brass.  As a result, virtually all premiums manufactured during the war were made of "noncritical" materials, such as wood, paper (including cardboard and card stock), and cloth.  Some items made of luminous material were made into items to help in blackouts.  At least one show offered a "Plane Spotter" premium, showing silhouettes of various types of allied and enemy aircraft, like those used by Office of Civilian Defense personnel.  

One subset of radio premiums were cryptological, mostly based on cipher disks.  Ovaltine Foods issued these for Little Orphan Annie and Captain Midnight. At least once a week, secret messages were broadcast at the close of an episode, each of which was invariably a preview of the forthcoming episode.  These could be deciphered with one of the "decoder" premiums.  A spoof on this was depicted in the movie A Christmas Story.

Radio premiums got more multifunctional over the years, and by 1950, some of them had as many as four separate features.  The Sky King radio program had several of the most innovative premiums.  But by that time, the radio shows were phasing out because of the increasing influence of television.

Further reading
Hake's Price Guide to Character Toys Ted Hake (New York: Avon Books 
Tomart's Price Guide to Radio Premium and Cereal Box Collectibles Tom Tumbusch (Dayton, OH: Tomart Publications 
Jim Harmon, The Great Radio Heroes (MacFarland, 2001).

Trivia
In September 2006, Bill McMahon offered a presentation entitled "Old Time Radio Premiums" explaining in detail, why premiums were offered and constructed.  The presentation was among the events held at the annual Mid atlantic nostalgia convention in Aberdeen, Maryland.

External links 
 Radio Premium Exchange
 Radio Premium History
 WheatiesWings
 Old-Time Radio Premiums
 Book Review for Radio Premiums
 Old-Time Radio Convention, OTR Premiums Presentation, September 2006

Radio in the United States